Landville is an unincorporated community in Logan County, West Virginia, United States. Landville had a post office, which closed on July 9, 1988.

The community most likely derives its name from one Mr. Landstreet, a businessperson in the coal-mining industry.

References

Unincorporated communities in Logan County, West Virginia
Unincorporated communities in West Virginia
Populated places on the Guyandotte River